Klaxon Company v. Stentor Electric Manufacturing Company, 313 U.S. 487 (1941), was a United States Supreme Court case in which the Court applied the choice-of-law principles of Erie Railroad v. Tompkins to conflicts between laws of different states for cases sitting in federal court on diversity jurisdiction.  The court held that a federal court sitting in diversity must apply the choice-of-law doctrine of the forum state to choose between the forum state's law and the other state's law (as distinguished from the federal choice-of-law doctrines which had been used before Erie).

See also
List of United States Supreme Court cases, volume 313

References

External links
 

United States Supreme Court cases
United States Supreme Court cases of the Hughes Court
Diversity jurisdiction case law
1941 in United States case law
Conflict of laws case law